Arthur Mathews may refer to:

 Arthur Frank Mathews (1860–1945), American painter
 Arthur Mathews (writer) (born 1959), Irish comedy writer 
 Arthur Matthews (politician) (died 1942), Irish Cumann na nGaedhael politician
 Arthur Matthews (missionary), Protestant Christian missionary who served in China
 Arthur Matthews (mathematician) (1848–1911), founding professor at Rhodes University, Grahamstown, South Africa
 Arthur Matthews (rugby league) (1889–?), New Zealand rugby league player
 Arthur John Matthews (1860–1942), principal/president of Arizona State University, then known as the Tempe Normal School
 Arthur Kenneth Mathews (1906–1992), Dean of St Albans